Grayson Murphy may refer to:

 Grayson M. P. Murphy (1878–1937), American banker and company director
 Grayson Murphy (runner), American mountain runner
 Grayson Murphy (basketball) (born 1999), American basketball player